Morton Salkind (June 1, 1932 – October 4, 2014) was an American politician who served as the Mayor of Marlboro Township from 1969 to 1975 and in the New Jersey General Assembly from 1974 to 1976.

He died of liver cancer on October 4, 2014, in Denville Township, New Jersey at age 82.

References

1932 births
2014 deaths
Mayors of places in New Jersey
Democratic Party members of the New Jersey General Assembly
People from Denville, New Jersey
People from Marlboro Township, New Jersey
Politicians from Monmouth County, New Jersey